Belčji Vrh is a village south of the town of Črnomelj in the White Carniola area of southeastern Slovenia. The area is part of the traditional region of Lower Carniola and is now included in the Southeast Slovenia Statistical Region.

Name
Belčji Vrh was attested in historical documents as Polcz in 1458, Pälcz in 1464, and Wirlsperg in 1468, among other spellings.

Church
The local church is dedicated to Saint Helena and belongs to the Parish of Dragatuš. It was first mentioned in written documents dating to 1526, but was refurbished in the Baroque style in the mid-18th century. The main altar dates to the second half of the 19th century.

References

External links
Belčji Vrh on Geopedia

Populated places in the Municipality of Črnomelj